An everything bagel is a type of bagel baked with a mix of toppings. The exact ingredients vary, but recipes may include caraway seeds, garlic flakes, onion flakes, poppy seeds, sesame seeds and salt. The bagels are made with regular dough and the name is independent of additional fillings such as cream cheese.

The everything bagel inspired other bread creations with similar toppings, such as everything bagel chips, everything croissants, everything rolls, everything roti, everything fusilli, and everything hot dog buns. Even mixed nuts have been flavored with the mixture. It is offered by many bakeries and fast casual restaurants. Its origins are disputed, but it was likely first created sometime between 1973 and 1980.

Origin 
The origin of the everything bagel is disputed.  Food historian Maria Balinska, author of The Bagel: The Surprising History of a Modest Bread, said the time saw experimentation in bagel flavors, and it is possible that multiple people came up with the idea independently.

A 1977 article in Newsday on where to eat in Syosset, NY, noted that at Bagel Master, "for those who can never decide if they want plain, salt, poppy seed, sesame seed, garlic or onion, there's something called the everything bagel, which is topped with all of them."

David Gussin claims he invented it sometime around 1980: while sweeping up leftover bagel toppings from the oven, Gussin saved them in a bin and convinced the store owner to make bagels with them. He concurs that others might have previously invented the concept but insists that he coined the name "everything bagel".

Others who have claimed to have invented the everything bagel include American restaurateur Joe Bastianich and sports marketer Brandon Steiner. In his blog, Seth Godin said he worked in a bagel factory that produced everything bagels two years before Gussin. Brandon Steiner, who believes his invention at a bakery in 1973 predates the others, wrote in a 2016 blog post: "One night I was screwing around with different combinations of toppings – sesame, salt, poppy, onion and garlic – making braids, onion flats, and other unorthodox concoctions. Then, after a while, I had the thought to throw all the toppings on a bagel at once. That’s how I invented the everything bagel. This was 1973; I was 14."

Allusions

An everything bagel is the MacGuffin in the 2022 movie Everything Everywhere All at Once. In this movie, it is topped with literally everything in the multiverse.

References

Bagels
Jewish breads
Jewish baked goods
Ashkenazi Jewish cuisine
Jewish American cuisine
Cuisine of New York City
Food and drink introduced in the 20th century